Santa María   is a corregimiento in Santa María District, Herrera Province, Panama with a population of 1,682 as of 2010. It is the seat of Santa María District. Its population as of 1990 was 2,591; its population as of 2000 was 1,641.

References

Corregimientos of Herrera Province